749 Malzovia (prov. designation:  or ) is a stony background asteroid from the inner regions of the asteroid belt, approximately  in diameter. It was discovered on 5 April 1913, by Russian astronomer Sergey Belyavsky at the Simeiz Observatory on the Crimean peninsula. The elongated S-type asteroid has a rotation period of 5.9 hours. It was named after Russian amateur astronomer Nikolai Maltsov (S. I. Maltsov) who founded the discovering Simeïs Observatory in 1900.

Orbit and classification 

Located in the region of the Flora family, a giant asteroid family and the largest family of stony asteroids, Malzovia is a non-family asteroid of the main belt's background population when applying the hierarchical clustering method to its proper orbital elements. It orbits the Sun in the inner main-belt at a distance of 1.9–2.6 AU once every 3 years and 4 months (1,228 days; semi-major axis of 2.24 AU). Its orbit has an eccentricity of 0.17 and an inclination of 5° with respect to the ecliptic. The body's observation arc begins at the German Heidelberg Observatory on 30 April 1913, or 25 days after its official discovery observation at Simeiz Observatory.

Naming 

This minor planet was named after Russian amateur astronomer Nikolai Sergeevich Maltsov (S. I. Malzov) who founded the discovering Simeiz Observatory, which he later donated to the Pulkovo Observatory in 1911. Malzov was a close friend of Sergey Belyavsky and of Oskar Backlund, after whom asteroid 856 Backlunda was named. After World War I, Malzov lived at Menton, on the French Riviera near Italy. The  was mentioned in The Names of the Minor Planets by Paul Herget in 1955.

Physical characteristics 

In the Tholen and Bus–Binzel SMASS classification, Malzovia is a common, stony S-type asteroid.

Rotation period 

In February 2020, a rotational lightcurve of Malzovia was obtained from photometric observations by French amateur astronomer René Roy. Lightcurve analysis gave a well-defined rotation period of  hours with a high brightness variation of  magnitude, indicative of its elongated shape.

Poles 

Each modeled lightcurve also determined two poles at (53.0°, 37.0°) and (242.0°, 46.0°), as well as (55.0°, 46.0°) and (246.0°, 55.0°), respectively.

Diameter and albedo 

The Collaborative Asteroid Lightcurve Link assumes an albedo of 0.24 and calculates a diameter of 12.98 kilometers based on an absolute magnitude of 11.6.

Notes

References

External links 
 Lightcurve Database Query (LCDB), at www.minorplanet.info
 Dictionary of Minor Planet Names, Google books
 Asteroids and comets rotation curves, CdR – Geneva Observatory, Raoul Behrend
 Discovery Circumstances: Numbered Minor Planets (1)-(5000) – Minor Planet Center
 
 

000749
Discoveries by Sergei Belyavsky
Named minor planets
000749
000749
19130405